Polystichum aleuticum, the Aleutian holly fern or Aleutian shield fern, is an endangered species of  the Polystichum genus and currently consisting of a small, vulnerable population endemic found only on Adak Island, Alaska, a remote island of the Aleutian Islands chain in the northern Pacific Ocean. In 1992, 112 specimens existed in the wild, and a recovery plan was implemented.

The Aleutian shield fern is the only native plant of  Alaska on the federal endangered species list.  As there are fewer than 150 plants known to exist, it is a very rare North American plant. It was listed as endangered in 1988. Polystichum aleuticum was first described in 1938, but it could not be located again until 1975 when a group was identified on Mount Reed on Adak Island.  A second, third, and fourth population, all on Mount Reed, was located in 1988, 1993, and 1999, respectively. Searches on other Aleutian Islands since 1988 have failed to identify additional populations.

Distribution
It is unlike any other known shield fern found in North America, and originally it was questioned whether it even belonged to the genus Polystichum. However, it was found to be similar to a dwarf Polystichum species native to southwestern mountains of China and the Himalayas.

Description
The Polystichum aleuticum fern is described as erect and approximately six inches tall. It usually found growing alone, rather than in groups. It has a fibrous root with dead leaf remnants attached. Its leaves, visible during the growing season, are light or dark olive green, and tapering. Each of its fronds has 15 to 25 pairs of leaflets (pinnae) that are either sessile or have short stalks and are 4 to 8 mm in length. The upper leaflets each have one spore-producing sori (sometimes two) on the leaflet under surface that is protected by the indusium, a flap of tissue. The spores are produced in July and August.

Notes

External links
USDA Plant Profile: Polystichum aleuticum
Flora of North America — Polystichum aleuticum

aleuticum
Flora of Alaska
Endemic flora of the United States
Ferns of the United States
~
Critically endangered flora of the United States
Plants described in 1938